Ronald or Ron Gould may refer to:
Sir Ronald Gould (trade unionist) (1904–1986), British trade unionist, general secretary of the National Union of Teachers
Ronald M. Gould (born 1946), American judge
Ronald Gould (mathematician) (born 1950), American mathematician
Ron Gould (politician) (born 1965), American politician from Arizona
Ron Gould (American football) (born 1965), American football player and coach